Redemption Day may refer to:

"Redemption Day", a song by Sheryl Crow recorded for:
Sheryl Crow (album), 1996
Threads (Sheryl Crow album), 2019
American VI: Ain't No Grave, a 2010 posthumous album by Johnny Cash
"Redemption Day", an episode of the documentary series Deadliest Catch
 "Redemption Days", a song by Josh Osho from the 2011 album L.I.F.E
Redemption Day (film), a 2021 American action film

See also
Day of Redemption (disambiguation)